Time Trax is a 1994 action-platform video game developed by Malibu Interactive and published by THQ under the Malibu Games brand for the Super Nintendo Entertainment System. It is based on the television series of the same name, which aired from 1993 to 1994. It follows police captain Darien Lambert, joined by the Specified Encapsulated Limitless Memory Archive (S.E.L.M.A.) supercomputer, traveling back in time to capture commander Sepp Dietrich and doctor Mordecai Sahmbi, who has sent crimial fugitives back in time to assist him in his plan of changing history and gain control of the future. The player controls Lambert across eight levels, apprehening enemies using a stunner weapon capable of sending them back to the future. The player can also stall time to slow down speed and use martial arts on combat against enemies.

The game was created by Malibu Interactive, an American-British studio first established by Cinemaware co-founder Bob Jacob as Acme Interactive with former Ocean Software and Software Creations staff, before becoming a software division after merging with Malibu Graphics in 1992. It was co-produced by George Sinfield, Ian McGee, and Steve Ryno. The soundtrack was scored by Richard Joseph. A Sega Genesis version, featuring music composed by Tim Follin, was developed but never released for unknown reasons until a prototype was leaked online. Time Trax on SNES garnered generally favorable reception from critics.

Gameplay 

Time Trax is a side-scrolling action-platform game based on the television series of the same name, similar to Rolling Thunder (1986) and the Super Star Wars titles. The plot follows police captain Darien Lambert of the Fugitive Retrieval Section, joined by the Specified Encapsulated Limitless Memory Archive (S.E.L.M.A.) supercomputer, traveling back in time using the Trax machine to capture commander Sepp Dietrich and apprehend crimial fugitives and doctor Mordecai Sahmbi, who has sent crimial fugitives back in time to assist him in his plan of changing history and gain control of the future. 

Controlling Lambert, the player travels across eight levels that take place in various locations in order to confront Dietrich and Sahmbi, while apprehending crimial fugitives sent back in time. Lambert is equipped with the "Pellet Projection Tube" (PPT) weapon, which is capable of stunning enemies for a brief time period and shoot pellets that render them transportable to the future. The player can also stall time to slow down speed and use martial arts on hand-to-hand combat against enemies.

Development and release 
Time Trax was first published for the Super Nintendo Entertainment System in North America on April 1994 (although some sources list October 1993 and March 1994), and later in Europe between May and June of that year by THQ under the Malibu Games brand. It is based on the television series of the same name, which aired from 1993 to 1994. It was developed by Malibu Interactive, a defunct American-British game developer initially established by Cinemaware co-founder Robert "Bob" Jacob under the name Acme Interactive with a staff made up of former Ocean Software and Software Creations employees, before merging with Malibu Graphics (who seeked to capitalize on the growing video game market) in 1992 to form Malibu Comics and becoming its software division. It was co-produced by George Sinfield, Ian McGee, and Steve Ryno. Terry Lloyd served as designer, with Robert Toone acting as main programmer. Lloyd was also responsible for the artwork along with Lee Pullen and Robert Hemphill. The soundtrack was scored by English composer Richard Joseph. Several staff members also collaborated in the game's development process.

In 1993, a Sega Genesis version of Time Trax was announced alongside the SNES version at the Consumer Electronics Show of that year and slated for launch between January and April of 1994. It was set to be published by THQ under the Black Pearl Software brand and despite being reviewed in major gaming publications, this version was never released for unknown reasons until a prototype ROM image in a fully finished state was leaked online in 2013. The most notable difference of the Genesis version is its soundtrack, scored by English composer Tim Follin using a sound driver written by Dean Belfield.

Reception 

Time Trax on Super NES garnered generally favorable reviews from critics. GameFans four reviewers regarded it as a good action-platform title, highlighting its detailed character animation, solid gameplay mechanics, and high degree of difficulty, though they felt the music could have been better. Game Playerss Erik Lundrian concurred with GameFan on most points, noting the lack of passwords or continues, but argued that the soundtrack added suspense to the game. Consoles + Richard Homsy and Nicolas Gavet agreed with Lundrian, commending the "well thought-out" scenario, graphical effects, fast animation movements, audio, and playability. However, both Homsy and Gavet commented that the lack of continues may seem off-putting. 

In contrast, Nintendo Players Stéphane Pilet gave the game an overall mixed outlook. GamePros Manny LaMancha gave positive remarks to the game's audiovisual presentation and high level of challenge. Joypads Olivier Prézeau and Nini Nourdine expressed similar thoughts as other reviewers, praising the varied graphics, smooth scrolling, controls, and sound. Nevertheless, both Prézeau and Nourdine saw the lack of continues as a negative aspect. Player Ones Julien Van De Steene commended the animations and playability, but found the music "cheesy" and felt that the graphics underutilized the Super Nintendo's capabilities. 

Total!s Will Groves agreed with De Steene regarding the visuals and sound, ultimately finding its gameplay enjoyable but uninspired. Writing for the German edition, Hans-Joachim Amann labelled it as a below-average title. GamesMasters Tim Tucker commended the title for its sound and playability reminiscent of the Super Star Wars games, but found the graphics average and expressed mixed feelings regarding lastability. Nintendo Magazine Systems Paul Davies and Andy McVittie praised the game's presentation, detailed visuals, audio, playability, and longevity. 

Superjuegos Juan Carlos Sanz lauded the game's backgrounds and large bosses, but found the lackluster enemy sprites and small number of weapons as low points. Computer and Video Games summarized their review by writing: "Challenging, absorbing and loads of fun to play - one of the best platform beat-'em-ups on the SNES." Spanish publication Nintendo Acción gave positive remarks to the audiovisual presentation but noted the character's minimal fighting ability. Video Gamess Robert Zengerle stated that "Time Trax is an excellent action platformer."

Notes

References

External links 

 Time Trax at GameFAQs
 Time Trax at Giant Bomb
 Time Trax at MobyGames

1994 video games
Action video games
Cancelled Sega Genesis games
Malibu Interactive games
Platform games
Side-scrolling platform games
Side-scrolling video games
Single-player video games
Super Nintendo Entertainment System games
Super Nintendo Entertainment System-only games
THQ games
Video games about police officers
Video games about time travel
Video games based on television series
Video games developed in the United States
Video games scored by Richard Joseph
Video games scored by Tim Follin